Marzi Darreh (also Romanized as Marzī Darreh; also known as Mīrzā Darreh) is a village in Lafur Rural District, North Savadkuh County, Mazandaran Province, Iran. At the 2006 census, its population was 120, in 38 families.

References 

Populated places in Savadkuh County